Reverend Father Maurice Edouard Tallon (22 October 1906 – 21 July 1982) was a French Jesuit archaeologist notable for his work on prehistory in Lebanon. Born in Mornant, France, he was son of Edouard Tallon and attended Mongre College, (Clermont-Ferrand).

References

External links
Genealogical profile of Maurice Tallon

20th-century French Jesuits
French Roman Catholic missionaries
French archaeologists
1906 births
1982 deaths
Jesuit scientists
Roman Catholic missionaries in Lebanon
French expatriates in Lebanon
20th-century archaeologists